Events from the year 1676 in China.

Incumbents 
 Kangxi Emperor (15th year)

Events 
 The Revolt of the Three Feudatories continues
 Geng Jingzhong surrenders to the Qing, has his title Prince of Jingnan restored and pledges to fight the other revolting feudatories.
 Shang Zhixin revolts against the Qing, placing Guangdong under his rule and moving his troops north into Jiangxi
 Sino-Russian border conflicts

References

 
 .

 
China